NGC 6200 is an open cluster in the constellation Ara, lying close to the galactic equator. It contains one β Cephei variable.

References

External links
 
 
 

NGC 6200
6200
Ara (constellation)